Ptochoryctis acrosticta is a moth in the family Autostichidae. It was described by Edward Meyrick in 1906. It is found in Sri Lanka.

The forewings are shining white with an almost apical dark grey dot. The hindwings are whitish.

References

Moths described in 1906
Ptochoryctis